The list of shipwrecks in 1977 includes ships sunk, foundered, grounded, or otherwise lost during 1977.

January

3 January

10 January

13 January

17 January

20 January

23 January

25 January

Unknown date

February

2 February

7 February

13 February

14 February

17 February

18 February

19 February

24 February

March

1 March

6 March

9 March

27 March

April

28 April

Unknown date

May

4 May

6 May

9 May

18 May

19 May

June

1 June

3 June

5 June

29 June

Unknown date

July

4 July

11 July

22 July

25 July

29 July

August

16 August

17 August

22 August

30 August

31 August

September

7 September

25 September

Unknown date

October

3 October

12 October

14 October

15 October

16 October

22 October

23 October

26 October

November

6 November

8 November

11 November

16 November

22 November

24 November

25 November

Unknown date

December

2 December

3 December

4 December

6 December

7 December

9 December

20 December

25 December

27 December

Unknown date

References

1977
 
Ships